The 2011–12 Montenegrin Cup was the sixth season of the Montenegrin knockout football tournament. The winner of the tournament received a berth in the first qualifying round of the 2012–13 UEFA Europa League. The defending champions were Rudar, who beat Mogren in the final of the 2010–11 competition. The competition featured 30 teams. It started on 24 August 2011 and ended with the final on 23 May 2012.

First round
The 14 matches were played on 24 August 2011, with the exception of the Blue Star vs Čelik match, which was played the next day.

Summary

|}

Matches

Second round
The 14 winners from the First Round and last year's cup finalists, Rudar and Mogren, compete in this round. Starting with this round, all rounds of the competition will be two-legged except for the final.  The first legs were held on 14 September 2011, while the second legs were held on 28 September 2011.

Summary

|}

First legs

Second legs

Quarter-finals
The eight winners from the Second Round competed in this round. The first legs took place on 19 October 2011 and the second legs took place on 2 November 2011.

Summary

|}

First legs

Second legs

Semi-finals
The four winners from the quarter-finals competed in this round. These matches took place on 28 March and 25 April 2012.

Summary

|}

First legs

Second legs

Final

References

External links
Montenegrin Cup 2011-2012 (pages 57-62) at Football Association of Montenegro's official site
Montenegrin Cup 2011-2012 at Soccerway
Montenegrin Cup 2011-2012 at RSSSF

Montenegrin Cup seasons
Montenegrin Cup
Cup